The New Teacher is a 1922 American silent drama film directed by Joseph Franz and starring Shirley Mason, Allan Forrest and Earl Metcalfe.

Cast
 Shirley Mason as Constance Bailey
 Allan Forrest as Bruce Van Griff
 Earl Metcalfe as Edward Hurley 
 Otto Hoffman as Joseph Hurley
 Olah Norman as Mrs. Brissell 
 Pat Moore as George Brissell
 Kate Price as Mrs. Brennan

References

Bibliography
 Munden, Kenneth White. The American Film Institute Catalog of Motion Pictures Produced in the United States, Part 1. University of California Press, 1997.

External links
 

1922 films
1922 drama films
1920s English-language films
American silent feature films
Silent American drama films
American black-and-white films
Films directed by Joseph Franz
Fox Film films
1920s American films